Murad Ismail Said (born 15 December 1982) is a Palestinian professional footballer who played as a defensive midfielder for Al-Wehdat in the Jordan Premier League and the Palestine national football team.

After his performance for his country in the AFC Challenge Cup, Said was named the tournament's most-valuable-player as he led Palestine to qualification for the 2015 AFC Asian Cup.

Honours

Palestine
 AFC Challenge Cup (1): 2014

Al-Wehdat

Jordan League : 2013–14
Jordan FA Cup : 2013–14

Hilal Al-Quds

West Bank Premier League : 2011–12

Individual
 2014 AFC Challenge Cup Most Valuable Player.

References

External links 
 

1982 births
Living people
Palestinian footballers
Hilal Al-Quds Club players
Al-Wehdat SC players
Association football midfielders
Palestine international footballers
Place of birth missing (living people)
2015 AFC Asian Cup players